John Brown (born c. 1876) was a Scottish footballer who played for Sunderland as a midfielder. He made his debut for Sunderland on 4 September 1897 against Sheffield Wednesday in a 1–0 win at Olive Grove. Overall, he made 33 league appearances scoring nine goals while at the club, spanning from 1897 to 1899.

References

1870s births
Scottish footballers
Sunderland A.F.C. players
Year of death missing
Association football midfielders